Högsjö is a locality situated in Vingåker Municipality, Södermanland County, Sweden with 713 inhabitants in 2010.

Riksdag elections

References 

Populated places in Södermanland County
Populated places in Vingåker Municipality